Aaron vandenBerg (born 3 March 1992) is a professional Australian rules footballer who played for the Melbourne Football Club in the Australian Football League (AFL). After missing out on the draft at eighteen years of age, vandenBerg played in the North East Australian Football League (NEAFL) with the Ainslie Football Club where he won two best and fairest awards and was twice named in the NEAFL team of the year. His performances in the NEAFL saw him recruited by the Melbourne Football Club with the second selection in the 2015 rookie draft and he made his AFL debut in the opening round of the 2015 season.

Early life
Originally from Western Australia, vandenBerg moved to Tathra, New South Wales with his family at ten-years of age. He was first noticed as a potential AFL player in 2007 by then- recruiter, Jason Taylor, however he was not drafted due to lacking "the drive to be an AFL footballer." He moved to Canberra in 2011 to join  in the North East Australian Football League (NEAFL), where he won the eastern conference premiership in his first year, and back-to-back Hibberson Cup Trophies as the club best and fairest player in 2013 and 2014. In addition, he was named in the NEAFL team of the year on the wing and as the ruck rover in 2013 and 2014 respectively. During 2014, he amassed fifty-six disposals in a match against Eastlake, which contributed to him being recognised as a high-disposal winner and put him back on the AFL radar. Whilst living in Canberra, he was completing a four-year apprenticeship at the Royal Australian Mint, but ended it after two and a half years to move to Melbourne.

AFL career

vandenBerg was drafted by the Melbourne Football Club with their first selection and second overall in the 2015 rookie draft. After a shoulder reconstruction at the end of 2014, Melbourne football operations manager, Josh Mahoney, stated vandenBerg was "exceeding expectations" and he made his debut in the 2015 opening round, twenty-six point win against  at the Melbourne Cricket Ground. He was named in the best players for Melbourne and recorded seventeen disposals, four marks and a goal. Lauded for his tenacity and ability to win the contested ball, he played the first ten matches of the year before suffering a hamstring strain in the annual Queen's Birthday clash against . He returned to the side in round fifteen against , and played the next four matches before injuring his ankle in August, he was then ruled out for the rest of the season after playing fourteen matches in his debut season. After signing a contract extension until the end of the 2017 season, he was promoted from the rookie list to the senior list for the 2016 season onward.

Despite suffering from an ankle injury during the 2016 pre-season, vandenBerg played the start of the season in the senior side. He played in the first three matches of the season before re-aggravating his ankle injury, and he was forced to miss a month of football. He made his return to football in the Victorian Football League (VFL), playing for Melbourne's  affiliate team, the Casey Scorpions. He returned to the senior side for the eighteen point loss against  at the Melbourne Cricket Ground in round eleven. He played the next five matches before missing the round eighteen match against  at Domain Stadium due to a hip injury. He returned the next week for the two point win against Gold Coast at the Melbourne Cricket Ground where he kicked a career high three goals and was named in Melbourne's best. He played the remainder of the season to finish with fourteen games.

Statistics

|- style="background-color: #EAEAEA"
! scope="row" style="text-align:center" | 2015
|
| 37 || 14 || 5 || 12 || 143 || 92 || 235 || 44 || 70 || 0.4 || 0.9 || 10.2 || 6.6 || 16.8 || 3.1 || 5.0 || 3
|-
! scope="row" style="text-align:center" | 2016
|
| 37 || 14 || 12 || 9 || 80 || 125 || 205 || 43 || 50 || 0.9 || 0.8 || 5.7 || 8.9 || 14.6 || 3.1 || 3.6 || 0
|- style="background-color: #EAEAEA"
! scope="row" style="text-align:center" | 2017
|
| 22 || 0 || — || — || — || — || — || — || — || — || — || — || — || — || — || — || 0
|-
! scope="row" style="text-align:center" | 2018
|
| 22 || 7 || 5 || 6 || 61 || 50 || 111 || 30 || 22 || 0.7 || 0.9 || 8.7 || 7.1 || 15.9 || 4.3 || 3.1 || 0
|- style="background-color: #EAEAEA"
! scope="row" style="text-align:center" | 2019
|
| 22 || 0 || — || — || — || — || — || — || — || — || — || — || — || — || — || — || 0
|-
! scope="row" style="text-align:center" | 2020
|
| 22 || 12 || 1 || 1 || 73 || 69 || 142 || 34 || 31 || 0.1 || 0.1 || 6.1 || 5.8 || 11.8 || 2.8 || 2.6 || 0
|- style="background-color: #EAEAEA"
! scope="row" style="text-align:center" | 2021
|
| 22 || 4 || 0 || 0 || 18 || 9 || 27 || 3 || 8 || 0.0 || 0.0 || 4.5 || 2.3 || 6.8 || 0.8 || 2.0 || 0
|- class="sortbottom"
! colspan=3| Career
! 51
! 23
! 28
! 375
! 345
! 720
! 154
! 181
! 0.5
! 0.5
! 7.4
! 6.8
! 14.1
! 3.0
! 3.5
! 3
|}

Notes

References

External links

Aaron vandenBerg's profile from Demonwiki

1992 births
Living people
Australian rules footballers from the Australian Capital Territory
Melbourne Football Club players
Ainslie Football Club players
Casey Demons players
Australian people of Dutch descent